The Bar U Ranch National Historic Site, located near Longview, Alberta, is a preserved ranch that for 70 years was one of the leading ranching operations in Canada. Two owners were instrumental in the establishment of the Calgary Stampede, forming part of the Big Four.

Stimson used the Bar U brand for NWCC stock. From 1902 to 1925 the Bar U was operated by George Lane and his business partners, whose business ventures included meat packing, mills and other farms and ranches. Lane renamed the operation the Bar U Ranch, buying out his partners in 1908. Lane raised both cattle and Percherons.

From 1927 to 1950 the Bar U was part of a group of ranches operated by Patrick Burns totally 700,000 acres. Burns grew grains on the ranch, which remained one of the largest ranches in Canada during the period.

After 1950 much of the ranch land was sold. The present National Historic Site is the central remnant, owned by Parks Canada, which bought the property in 1991 and opened it to the public in 1995.

A number of prominent personalities were associated with the Bar U. In 1891 the notoriously infamous Harry Longabaugh was a horse breaker at the Bar U, later becoming the outlaw and Wild West gun fighter "the Sundance Kid". Edward, Prince of Wales visited the Bar U in 1919 and was so taken with it that he bought a neighboring ranch, which he named the EP. Charles M. Russell painted a series of paintings at the Bar U. Ranch cowboy Everett Johnson was reportedly studied as the lead character for the novel The Virginian and the later television show.

References

External links

Foothills County
National Historic Sites in Alberta
Ranches in Alberta
Museums in Alberta
Agriculture museums in Canada
1881 establishments in the Northwest Territories